Paul Sédir or Sédir (born Yvon Le Loup; 2 January 1871 - 3 February 1926) was a French mystic and esotericist, notable as the author on several works on esotericism and Christian mysticism.

Life
He was born to Hippolyte de Loup and his wife Séraphine Foeller on rue de la Lainerie in Dinan, Brittany. The couple were from Neustadt near Fulda in Germany. He was not in Brittany for long and spent most of his childhood in Paris, joining the Banque de France on 28 October 1892 as an "auxiliary agent" and remaining in the same job for twenty years in the "Dépôts de titres". He had been teaching himself about esotericism for around two, years when he met Papus (Dr Gérard Encausse) in 1889 at the "Librairie du Merveilleux" bookshop, founded by Lucien Chamuel around 1888, a gathering-place for those interested in the subject as well as a publishing house and conference hall. Papus immediately became a close friend, opening his personal library of works on symbolism, philosophy and esotericism to Le Loup, who was eager for knowledge. He began collaborating with Papus, through whom he also met Stanislas de Guaita, who also gave him access to his library. Sédir was a prolific writer and constantly contributed in writing articles for Papus' magazine Le Voile d'Isis. He was initiated into the Martinist Order, in which he became Superior Inconnu Initiateur [Superior Unknown Inititator] and a member of the Supereme Council before leaving the Order in 1910.

Works 
 Les Tempéraments et la Culture psychique, d'après Jakob Böhme; Chamuel, 1894. 
 Les Miroirs magiques. Théories, constructions, entraînements; Chamuel, 1894. 3° éd. revue 1907 
 Les Incantations. Le Verbe, le son et la lumière astrale, expériences théories de l'Inde et de Boehme; Chamuel, 1897.
 Le Bienheureux Jacob Boehme - le coordonnier philosophe. Sa vie, ses œuvres, sa doctrines, et un vocabulaire de la terminologie; Chamuel, 1897
 La Création. Théories ésotériques; Chamuel, 1898
 Les Rêves. Théories, pratique, interprétation; Beaudelot, 1900
 La Cabbale;La Maison d'Art, 1900
 La Médecine occulte - Revue de toutes les thérapeutiques : alchimique, magique, magnétique, astrale, volontaire, religieuse, théurgique; La Maison d'Art, 1900. 
 Lettres magiques - Roman d'initiations orientales; Ollendorff, 1901
 Éléments d'hébreu, d'après la méthode de Fabre d'Olivet; Ollendorff, 1901
 Les Plantes magiques. Botanique occulte, constitution secrète des végétaux, vertus des simples, médecine hermétique, philtres, onguents, breuvages magiques, teintures, arcanes, élixirs spagyriques; Chacornac, 1902 
 Lettres magiques, 1903.  
 Les Tempéraments et la Culture psychique, d'après Jakob Böhme; Chacornac, 1906; a completely revised second edition of his 1894 work
 Le Fakirisme hindou et les Yogas. Thaumaturgie populaire. Constitution de l'homme invisible selon le brahmanisme. La force magnétique et la force mentale. Entraînements occultes; Chacornac, 1st edition 1906, 2nd considerably expanded edition, 1911 
 Bréviaire mystique - Règles de conduite, formules d'oraison, thèmes de méditation; Chacornac, 1909
 Conférences sur l'Evangile. 3 volumes; Beaudelot, 1908, 1909, 1911
 La Médecine occulte - Revue de toutes les thérapeutiques : alchimique, magique, magnétique, astrale, volontaire, religieuse, théurgique; reissue of the 1900 work; Beaudelot, 1910.
 Histoire et Doctrines des Rose-Croix (1st edition 1910). Bibliothèque des Amitiés Spirituelles. Ed. 1918  
 La Guerre de 1914 selon le point de vue mystique, 1910 - Conférences données à Paris en 1915 et 1916; Beaudelot, puis Bibliothèque des Amitiés Spirituelles. "La guerre actuelle selon le point de vue mystique" 
 Le Martyre de la Pologne; Crès, 1917 
 Le Berger de Brie, chien de France. Bibliothèque des Amitiés Spirituelles.
 En collaboration avec Papus : L'Almanach du Magiste; Chamuel, 1894–1899.
 Initiations, Albert le Grand, 1949

Undated works 
 Les Rose-Croix
 Les Sept Jardins mystiques
 La Voie mystique
 Preface to Les Logia Agrapha by Emile Besson

Works inspired by Christianity 
 Five commentaries on the Gospels :
 L'enfance du Christ, édition Legrand, 1926
 Le Sermon sur la Montagne
 Les Guérisons du Christ
 Le Royaume de Dieu
 Le couronnement de l'Œuvre
 Les Amitiés Spirituelles
 Quelques Amis de Dieu
 Le Cantique des Cantiques
 Le Devoir Spiritualiste, Bibliothèque Universelle Beaudelot (1910) 
 Les Directions Spirituelles
 La Dispute de Shiva contre Jésus
 L'éducation de la Volonté
 L'énergie ascétique
 Les Forces mystiques et la Conduite de la Vie
 Les Sept Jardins mystiques (1918) 
 Fragments. Édition anthologique
 Initiations
 Méditations pour chaque Semaine
 Mystique chrétienne
 La Voie mystique
 La Prière
 Les Rêves
 Le Sacrifice

Bibliography (in French)
 Émile Besson, Titre : Sédir, 
 Max Camis, Titre : Sédir (L'homme et l'œuvre - Les Amitiés Spirituelles - Textes de Sédir - Bibliographie); Bibliothèque des Amitiés Spirituelles, 1971.
Laurent Voegele, Titre : Sédir, une Sentinelle - Les Amitiés Spirituelles, 2019

Publications (translated in English) 

 Paul Sédir, Meditations for Every Week, The Three Luminaries, 2020.

References

External links
  Les Amitiés Spirituelles, an association founded by Sedir
  Online editions of his works at Livres-mystiques.com

Esotericists
French Christian mystics
People from Dinan
1871 births
1926 deaths